In navigation, the drift of a vessel or aircraft is the difference between heading and its course or track, due to the motion of the underlying medium, the air or water, or other effects like skidding or slipping. it can be determined by the wind triangle.

References 

Navigation